The 2017 Jayco Herald Sun Tour was a road cycling stage race that took place in Victoria, Australia, between 1 and 5 February 2017. The race was rated as a 2.1 event as part of the 2017 UCI Oceania Tour. The race included five stages: the first was a  prologue individual time trial stage, with the remaining four stages being road stages. The champion of the 2016 Herald Sun Tour, Chris Froome attempted to defend his title.

Teams

Fifteen teams were invited to take part in the race. These included two UCI WorldTeams, four UCI Professional Continental teams, seven UCI Continental teams and two national teams.

Route
The race route was released on 1 December 2016, with a route described by race director, and former three-time race winner, John Trevorrow as the "toughest course in recent history".

Stages

Prologue
1 February 2017 — Melbourne, individual time trial (ITT)

Stage 1
2 February 2017 — Wangaratta to Falls Creek,

Stage 2
3 February 2017 — Mount Beauty to Beechworth,

Stage 3
4 February 2017 — Benalla to Mitchelton Winery, Nagambie,

Stage 4
5 February 2017 — Kinglake to Kinglake,

Classification leadership table

References

External links
 

2017
Herald Sun Tour
Herald Sun Tour